The legislative district of Dasmariñas was the representation of the city of Dasmariñas, Cavite in the House of Representatives of the Philippines. The district corresponds to the 4th Legislative District of Cavite, which was created on October 22, 2009 just right before the ratification of the Charter of the City of Dasmariñas on November 25, 2009. Prior to being entitled its own representation, the municipality of Dasmariñas was represented in Congress as part of the lone district of Cavite from 1907 to 1972, and as part of Region IV-A in the Interim Batasang Pambansa from 1978 to 1984. From 1984 to 1986, it was represented at the Batasang Pambansa as part of the at-large district of Cavite, and was part of the second district of Cavite in the restored House of Representatives from 1987 to 2010.

With the reapportionment of Cavite into eight legislative districts by way of Republic Act 11069 signed by President Rodrigo Duterte into law on September 17, 2018, the lone district of Dasmariñas has effectively ceased existence and has reverted to being officially considered as the Fourth District of Cavite.

Lone District (defunct)
 Population (2015): 659,019
 Land Area (km²): 90.13

See also
 Dasmariñas
 Legislative districts of Cavite

References

Dasmariñas
Politics of Dasmariñas